Hitoshi Shirato (born 19 October 1958) is a Japanese former professional tennis player.

Biography
Born in 1958, Shirato was a leading Japanese player of the 1980s.

Shirato, a right-handed player, featured in a total of 10 Davis Cup ties for Japan. He won three Davis Cup singles rubbers, including one against India's Ramesh Krishnan in 1983.

During his career he competed in the doubles main draw at both the Australian Open and Wimbledon. His best performance was a third round appearance in the mixed doubles at the 1986 Wimbledon Championships.

See also
List of Japan Davis Cup team representatives

References

External links
 
 
 

1958 births
Living people
Japanese male tennis players
20th-century Japanese people